The Monterey Amberjacks are a professional baseball team based in Monterey, California, which began play in 2017. The team is a member of the Pecos League, an independent baseball league which is not affiliated with Major League Baseball or Minor League Baseball. They play their home games at Frank E. Sollecito, Jr. Ballpark, surrounded by Lake El Estero, with the beach at Monterey Bay Park a short distance beyond the left field fence.

Roster

Notable alumni

 Jared Koenig (2017)
 Logan Gillaspie (2017)

References

External links
 Monterey Amberjacks website

Pecos League teams
Professional baseball teams in California
Baseball teams established in 2016
2016 establishments in California
Sports in Monterey County, California
Monterey, California